Mictoschema tuckeri is a moth of the family Geometridae first described by Louis Beethoven Prout in 1925. It is found in Namibia.

References

Pseudoterpnini
Taxa named by Louis Beethoven Prout
Moths described in 1925